Maurice Tarplin (April 1, 1911, Boston, Massachusetts – May 12, 1975) was a novelist and a radio actor best known as the narrator of The Mysterious Traveler, employing a voice once described as "eerily sardonic."

Radio
Tarplin was a familiar voice as Dr. Weird on The Strange Dr. Weird and Inspector Faraday on Boston Blackie. He was heard on numerous other shows, including Valiant Lady, The Shadow, Theater Five, The March of Time (as Winston Churchill), Gangbusters and various soap operas. He played Los Angeles District Attorney Richard Hanley on The Guiding Light. On Myrt and Marge he played Barnie Belzer, and he was in several episodes of Tom Corbett, Space Cadet.

Writing
Tarplin's novel, Seven Casks of Death, was published in the June 1948 issue of Dime Mystery Magazine.

Television and film
In later years, Tarplin did voiceovers for TV commercials and worked on the English language soundtracks for foreign films.

Personal life
Tarplin was married to Grace Tarplin and had two boys.

His first marriage was to Catharine Selby Flygare in 1933. This marriage produced no children and ended during World War II. She died in 2010 at the age of 100.

References

Listen to
The Strange Dr. Weird (28 1944–45 episodes)

External links
 "Murder Clinic: Radio’s Golden Age of Detection"
 "Time Marches – on Radio!"

American male radio actors
1975 deaths
1911 births
20th-century American male actors